Jing Shyuan Lee (born 12 June 1967) is a Malaysian-Australian politician elected to the South Australian Legislative Council for the South Australian Division of the Liberal Party of Australia since the 2010 state election. She was formerly the president of the Asia Pacific Business Council for Women.

Early life
After completing primary school in 1979, Lee emigrated from Malaysia to South Australia. During her first years in Australia, she joined an English language program and entered into the public school system. After graduating from high school, she attended the University of South Australia where she studied business management.

Political career
Lee ran as the fourth candidate on the Liberal ticket in the South Australian Legislative Council at the 2010 state election. She was elected to the Legislative Council on the back of a 39.4 percent Liberal primary vote.

Since entering Parliament, Lee has taken the role of deputy whip of the opposition in the Legislative Council. She is a member of the Social Development parliamentary community. In December 2011, she was promoted to Shadow Parliamentary Secretary for Multicultural Affairs and Shadow Parliamentary Secretary for Small Business by Isobel Redmond.

In August 2020, Lee's connections to the Xinjiang Association of South Australia, an organization that has denied the existence of the Uyghur genocide and works closely with the Ministry of Foreign Affairs of the People's Republic of China, were reported. Following the reports, photos of Lee at the association events were removed from her social media accounts and some federal MPs in her party called for an investigation into Lee's reported links to the Chinese government on national security grounds.

In September 2020, Lee was selected by the Liberal Party as its preferred candidate to become president of the South Australian Legislative Council, where the party did not have a majority. Fellow Liberal John Dawkins also nominated for the role and was elected by the council, and consequently expelled from the Liberal Party.

References

External links
 
Parliamentary profile: SA Parliament website

Members of the South Australian Legislative Council
1967 births
Living people
Liberal Party of Australia members of the Parliament of South Australia
University of South Australia alumni
21st-century Australian politicians
Malaysian emigrants to Australia
Australian politicians of Chinese descent
Women members of the South Australian Legislative Council
21st-century Australian women politicians